Ꞑ, ꞑ (N with descender) is a letter of the Latin alphabet, used in several New Turkic Alphabet orthographies in 1930s (for instance, Tatar alphabet), as well as in the 1990s orthographies invented in attempts to restore the Latin alphabet for the Tatar language and the Chechen language.

In the majority of languages this letter represented a velar nasal (as in English singing). 

Due to problems with the display of this letter in phones and computers, it is sometimes replaced by a similar letter Ŋ ŋ.

History
The letter appeared in late 1920s in the New Turkic Alphabet, however it was borrowed by some other non-Turkic peoples of the Soviet Union during the Latinisation campaign. In the 1990s the letter was used in Chechen Latin alphabet, in 2000s it was used in the Tatar Latin alphabet, both of them however are not in wide use now. In the Chechen alphabet the majuscule looked similar to minuscule, but has a larger size.

Unicode

See also
Similar Latin letters:
Ŋ ŋ
Ƞ ƞ
Ɲ ɲ
Ñ ñ
Ň ň
Ņ ņ
ɳ
ɱ
ᶇ
Similar Cyrillic letters:
Ӈ ӈ
Ң ң
Ӊ ӊ
Ҥ ҥ
Ԩ ԩ

References

External links
 Quivira font. Currently one of the few that render the letter correctly.

Letters with descender (diacritic)
Latin-script letters